Fatih Artman (born 13 February 1988) is a Turkish actor. His family is of Bosnian descent. He graduated theatre department of Hacettepe University. He is best known for his performance as Harun in hit series Behzat Ç. Bir Ankara Polisiyesi. He has received critical acclaim for his role as Yasin in the 2020 Netflix series Ethos ("Bir Başkadır"). He has won the Sadri Alışık Award and Adana Film Festival Award for Best Actor for his role in Aşkın Gören Gözlere İhtiyacı Yok.

Filmography

Series

Movies

Theatre
Colombinus Düşler Yolu
Müfettiş Yastık Adam
Dünyada Karşılaşmış Gibi

References

External links 

1988 births
Living people
Turkish male film actors
Turkish male television actors
Turkish people of Bosniak descent
Male actors from Ankara